The IBM 602 Calculating Punch, introduced in 1946, was an electromechanical calculator capable of addition, subtraction, multiplication, and division. The 602 was IBM's first machine that did division. (The IBM 601, introduced in 1931, only multiplied.) Like other IBM calculators, it was programmed using a control panel. Input data was read from a punched card, the results could be punched in the same card or a trailing card.

The 602 was available in four models: Model 1, Model 2, Model 50, and Model 51. The "Series 50" models were low-cost versions that ran at a slower speed, with half as many program steps, and fewer storage registers and counters.

Two additional counters were available as an optional feature.

Program steps execute in one machine cycle, except for steps performing multiplication or division which take as many machine cycles as needed for the operation. Punching rate is roughly four columns per machine cycle. The total number of machine cycles required per card varies depending on the data and programming.

Programming the 602 for each problem involved two things:
A control panel wired for the sequence of the calculation
A Skip Bar with "inserts" placed for the first column of each field to punch

See also
 IBM 603
 IBM CPC
 IBM 604
 IBM 605
 IBM 608

References

External links
Columbia University Computing History: The IBM 602 Calculating Punch

602
Programmable calculators
Computer-related introductions in 1946